Crowbar was a Canadian rock band based in Hamilton, Ontario, best known for their 1971 hit "Oh, What a Feeling".

History 
From 1969 to 1970, most of the members of the group had been a backup band for Ronnie Hawkins under the name "And Many Others". However, in early 1970, he fired them; as he later told a friend, "Those boys could fuck up a crowbar in fifteen seconds." They recorded their first album in 1970, called Official Music, as "King Biscuit Boy with Crowbar". King Biscuit Boy left the band later in 1970 but continued to appear off and on as a guest performer.

In 1971, the band recorded a performance at Massey Hall, in Toronto, which was released as a double album, Larger than Life (and Live'r Than You've Ever Been). The concert, billed as "An Evening of Love with Daffodil Records", was co-produced by concert promoter Martin Onrot and Toronto radio station CHUM-FM. Numerous guests appeared with Crowbar at Massey Hall, including members of Lighthouse, Dr. Music, and Everyday People. King Biscuit Boy also returned to perform with his former bandmates. The recording and release of the album are significant as being the first time a Canadian band had recorded and released a "live in concert" album. It was also the first time that a live concert was broadcast simultaneous on CHUM-FM.

Also in 1971, the band performed a concert in the Lord Beaverbrook Grand Ballroom in New Brunswick and entertained at the anniversary celebrations in Hamilton, Ontario.

Due largely to Margaret Trudeau's enthusiasm for the band, Crowbar was featured as the opening act of Pierre Trudeau's 1972 re-election campaign rallies, including a notable stop at Toronto's Maple Leaf Gardens. This association enhanced the band's reputation in Canada and garnered international interest from agencies such as A&M Records and figures such as Clive Davis. Despite this momentum, their second album did not capture the energy of their first and the band faltered.

Crowbar disbanded in 1975 but was revived in 1977, without Jozef Chirowski, who had joined Alice Cooper's band. The band performed intermittently during the 1980s.

More recently, Crowbar played shows around Hamilton, Ontario, including a performance at their induction into the Canadian Songwriters Hall of Fame in 2011.

Members 
The band consisted of numerous players in various combinations over its lifetime, including:
King Biscuit Boy (Richard Newell) – vocals, harmonica, guitars
Roly Greenway – bass, vocals, percussion, guitars
Kelly Jay (Blake Fordham) (December 1, 1941 – June 21, 2019) – piano, vocals, harmonica, bass. Jay was the subject of an episode of Hoarding: Buried Alive, originally aired on April 10, 2013. He also featured on the cover of Rush's 1981 Moving Pictures (Rush Album) album 
John Rutter – vocals (1970)
Ed Charron – guitar (1973–1974)
Richard Bell – keyboards (1970)
Jozef Chirowski – organ, vocals, piano, flute, vibes, percussion
Larry Atamanuik – drums (1970)
Tim Nantais – bass
Sonnie Bernardi – drums, vocals
Paul Nicholls – guitars
Rheal Lanthier – guitars, vocals
John Gibbard – guitars, vocals
Sonny Del-Rio – saxophone
Ray Harrison – piano, Hammond B3 organ
John Dickie – vocals (2000)
Russell Foreman – guitars
Tim Thompson – drums (1978)
Rick Waites (aka Rock Watts) – bass
Terry Branagh – guitars

Discography

Albums 
Official Music (as King Biscuit Boy with Crowbar) (1970, Daffodil; 1996, Stony Plain)
Track listing
 "Highway 61" – 2:47
 "Don't Go No Further" – 3:38
 "Unseen Eye" – 2:54
 "I'm Just A Lonely Guy" – 2:29
 "Key To The Highway" – 3:15
 "Corrina, Corrina" – 4:18
 "Biscuit's Boogie" – 9:26
 "Hoy Hoy Hoy" – 5:20
 "Badly Bent" – 2:05
 "Cookin' Little Baby" – 2:25
 "Shout Bama Lama" – 2:25

Personnel
 King Biscuit Boy – vocals, harmonica, acoustic (1) and slide (4) guitars
 John "Greyhound" Gibbard – electric and slide guitars
 Rheal "Ray" Lanthier – electric guitars
 Kelly J. – piano, percussion
 Roly Greenway – bass
 Larry Atamanuik – drums
 John R. – percussion

''Bad Manors (1970, Daffodil SBA-16004)Track listing
 "Frenchman's Filler #1" – 1:13
 "Too True Mama" – 2:52
 "Let The Four Winds Blow" – 2:20
 "The House Of Blue Lights" – 2:44
 "Train Keep Rollin'" – 2:49
 "Baby Let's Play House" – 3:02
 "Oh What A Feeling" – 4:18
 "Frenchman's Filler #2" – 0:32
 "Frenchman's Filler #3" – 0:35
 "Murder In The First Degree" – 5:10
 "In The Dancing Hold" – 3:48
 "Mountain Fire" – 3:56
 "Prince Of Peace" – 4:07
 "Frenchman's Filler #1" – 0:45
Personnel
 John "The Ghetto" Gibbard – lead and slide guitars, vocals
 Rheal Lanthier – lead guitar, vocals
 Jozef Chirowski – organ, vocals, piano
 Kelly Jay – piano, vocals
 Roly Greenway – bass, vocals, percussion
 Sonnie Bernardi – drums, vocals, percussionLarger than Life (and Live'r than You've Ever Been) (1971, Daffodil 2-SBA-16007), recorded in concert at Massey Hall, TorontoTrack listing
 "Introduction" – 0:33
 "Prince Of Peace" – 3:37
 "Murder In The First Degree" – 3:36
 "Newspaper Song" – 2:36
 "Corinna Corinna" – 4:40
 "Fly Away" – 3:41
 "Tits Up On The Pavement" – 7:47
 "Mummy And Daddy" – 1:39
 "Ask Me No Questions" – 5:46
 "Over The Mountain" – 5:18
 "Cane On The Brazos" – 5:15
 "Rock Around The Clock / Shake, Rattle And Roll" – 2:05
 "In The Dancing Hold" – 3:45
 "Oh What A Feeling" – 8:50
Personnel
 John "Ghetto" Gibbard – electric guitar, vocals
 Rheal Lanthier – electric guitar, vocals
 Josef Chirowski – organ, vocals, piano, harmonica
 Kelly Jay – piano, vocals, harmonica, bass
 Roland "Roly" Greenway – bass, vocals, acoustic guitar
 Sonnie Bernardi – drums, vocals, percussion Heavy Duty'' (1972, Daffodil SBA-16013)
Track listing
Side one
 "Trilby" – (Kelly Jay) – 2:41
 "Listen Sister (A Mutual Liberation Ballad)" – (Kelly Jay) – 2:07
 "Hey Baby" – (Bruce Channel) – 2:55
 "Dreams" – (Josef Chirowski, John Gibbard) – 2:49
 "Where Were You" – (Kelly Jay) – 3:56
Side two
 "Dead Head Out Of St. John's" – (Kelly Jay) – 3:45
 "The Beaver And The Eagle" – (Kelly Jay) – 3:07
 "Cluckie's Escape" – (Roly Greenway) – 3:10
 "Snakes And Ladders" – (Kelly Jay) – 2:50
 "Lay One Down" – (Roly Greenway, LOVE) 4:28

Personnel
 Rheal Lantier – lead and rhythm guitars, backing vocals
 John Gibbard – lead, rhythm and slide guitars, backing vocals
 Kelly Jay – piano, lead and backing vocals
 Josef Chirowski – organ, lead and backing vocals, piano, flute, vibes
 Roly Greenway – bass, lead and backing vocals, cowbell, tambourine
 Sonnie Bernardi – drums, backing vocals, percussion

KE32746 (1973, Epic KE-32746)
Track listing
Side one
 "Million Dollar Weekend" – 3:04
 "Something Happened Yesterday" – 4:20
 "Trumpet Rose" – 3:25
 "All The Living Things" – 3:11
 "Go For The Throat" – 4:42
Side two
  "Kilroy" – 2:23
 "Rocky Mountain Tragedy" – 5:52
 "The Killing Time Trilogy" – 7:06
 "Killing Time
 "It Really Doesn't Matter
 "Hard On You
 "Killing Time – Reprise
 "Nothing Lasts Forever" – 3:27

Crowbar Classics: Memories Are Made of This (1975, Daffodil SBA-16030)

Singles 
1970 "Corrina, Corrina" (Daffodil) (as King Biscuit Boy with Crowbar), #29 CAN
1970 "Uncle Pen" / "Roberta" (London 17385)
1971 "Oh What a Feeling" (Daffodil), #10 CAN
1971 "Happy People" (Daffodil)
1972 "Too True Mama" (Daffodil), #60 CAN
1972 "Dreams" (Daffodil)
1972 "Fly Away" (Daffodil), #48 CAN
1972 "Hey Baby" (Daffodil), #59 CAN
1973 "Million Dollar Weekend" (Epic), #22 CAN
1974 "All the Living Things" (Epic), #81 CAN
1977 "Run, Run Rudolph" (Puck)

References

External links 
 Entry at Canadian Pop Encyclopedia
 CanConRox entry at CanadianBands.com

Musical groups established in 1970
Musical groups disestablished in 1975
Canadian rock music groups
Musical groups from Hamilton, Ontario
1970 establishments in Ontario
1975 disestablishments in Ontario